Fujiwara no Yoshikane (藤原 義懐) (957–1021) was a Japanese Heian era courtier. A son of Fujiwara no Koretada, he served under Emperor Kazan before joining his brother Korenari, and the Emperor in becoming monks, in 986. He also prevented the Emperor from committing suicide following the death of his wife Tsune-ko.

References
Papinot, Edmond (1910). Historical and geographical dictionary of Japan. Tokyo: Librarie Sansaisha.

957 births
1021 deaths
Fujiwara clan